Piet van Boxtel (6 October 1902 – 27 August 1991) was a Dutch footballer. He competed in the men's tournament at the 1928 Summer Olympics.

References

External links

1902 births
1991 deaths
Dutch footballers
Netherlands international footballers
Olympic footballers of the Netherlands
Footballers at the 1928 Summer Olympics
Footballers from Breda
Association football midfielders
NAC Breda players